The Washington National Airport Terminal and South Hangar Line in Arlington, Virginia is an historic airport terminal building from 1941 and a line of six hangars completed in 1948. It was listed on the National Register of Historic Places in 1975.

References

External links

http://www.dhr.virginia.gov/registers/Counties/Arlington/000-0045_W.National_Airport_Terminal_1997_Final_Nomination.pdf

Transportation buildings and structures on the National Register of Historic Places in Virginia
Buildings and structures in Arlington County, Virginia
National Register of Historic Places in Arlington County, Virginia
Air transportation buildings and structures on the National Register of Historic Places
Aircraft hangars on the National Register of Historic Places
1941 establishments in Virginia
Terminal and South Hangar Line